Jay Seay Ritchie (November 20, 1936 – January 5, 2016) was an American professional baseball right-handed pitcher, who played in Major League Baseball (MLB) for the Boston Red Sox, Atlanta Braves and Cincinnati Reds from  to .

Early life
Ritchie attended Granite Quarry High School in Granite Quarry, North Carolina where he starred in baseball and basketball. His combined pitching record his junior and senior years was 24–0 and upon graduation he was also the county's all-time basketball scoring leader.

Career
He was originally signed by the Red Sox as an amateur free agent in 1955. He was in his ninth season in Boston's farm system when he made his big league debut with the Red Sox on August 4, 1964, in a road game against the Minnesota Twins. Entering the game in relief of Bill Monbouquette, the first batter Ritchie faced was Baseball Hall of Fame slugger Harmon Killebrew, who singled. In four innings pitched that game, Ritchie allowed two hits and three walks, but did not allow an earned run in the 12–4 loss.

Ritchie’s rookie season overall was the best season of his career—in 21 games, he had a 1–1 record with a fine 2.74 earned run average (ERA) in 46 innings. The 1965 season was also a successful one for Ritchie, as he was 1–2 with a 3.17 ERA in 44 relief appearances, as was 1967, when he was 4–6 but again posted a 3.17 ERA in 52 relief appearances — which ranked 10th in the National League (NL).

On January 11, 1966, Ritchie was sent to the Atlanta Braves to complete a trade announced on December 15, 1965, in which the Red Sox sent Lee Thomas, Arnold Earley, and a player to be named later (Ritchie) to the Braves for Bob Sadowski and Dan Osinski.

Ritchie spent two seasons with the Braves, appearing in 22 games and posting a 4.08 ERA in 1966 and appearing in 52 games in 1967, posting a 3.17 ERA. In 1967, he tied for tenth in the league with Bob Miller in pitching appearances.

Following the 1967 season, Ritchie was traded to the Reds with Jim Beauchamp and Mack Jones for Deron Johnson.

Ritchie played his final season in 1968, appearing in 28 games for the Reds, starting two of them. Overall, he posted a 4.61 ERA that year, which was nearly a point and a half higher than the league average.

Overall in his MLB career, Ritchie posted an 8–13 record in 167 games. In 291 innings of work, he struck out 212 batters, walked 94 and had a 3.49 ERA. As a batter, he hit .200 in 35 at-bats, with the highlight of his hitting career being a triple he hit off a Don Cardwell of the New York Mets on May 16, 1967. It was the only extra base hit of his career. He had a .940 career fielding percentage.

In 2004, Ritchie was inducted into the Salisbury Rowan Sports Hall of Fame.

Later life and death
Ritchie lived in Kannapolis, North Carolina and died on January 5, 2016, in Rockwell, North Carolina.

References

External links

Jay Ritchie at Pura Pelota (Venezuelan Professional Baseball League)
 Jay Ritchie at SABR (Baseball BioProject)

1936 births
2016 deaths
Allentown Red Sox players
American expatriate baseball players in the Dominican Republic
American expatriate baseball players in Venezuela
Atlanta Braves players
Atlanta Braves scouts
Baseball players from North Carolina
Boston Red Sox players
Cincinnati Reds players
Corning Red Sox players
Indianapolis Indians players
Lafayette Red Sox players
Leones del Caracas players
Leones del Escogido players
Louisville Colonels (minor league) players
Major League Baseball pitchers
Minneapolis Millers (baseball) players
Navegantes del Magallanes players
People from Salisbury, North Carolina
People from Kannapolis, North Carolina
Raleigh Capitals players
Reading Red Sox players
Richmond Braves players
Seattle Rainiers players
York White Roses players